Alopoglossus atriventris, known commonly as the keel-bellied shade lizard, is a species of lizard in the family Alopoglossidae. The species is endemic to northwestern South America.

Etymology
The specific name, atriventris, is from Latin ater (black) + venter (belly), referring to the black belly of the male.

Geographic range
A. atriventris is found in Brazil (Acre, western Amazonas), Colombia, Ecuador, and Peru.

Habitat

Reproduction
A. atriventris is oviparous.

References

Further reading
Duellman WE (1973). "Descriptions of New Lizards from the Upper Amazon Basin". Herpetologica 29 (3): 228–231. (Alopoglossus ariventris, new species, p. 228).
Köhler G, Diethert H-H, Veselý M (2012). "A Contribution to the Knowledge of the Lizard Genus Alopoglossus (Squamata: Gymnophthalmidae)". Herpetological Monographs 26 (1): 173–188.
Ribeiro-Júnior MA (2018). "A new species of Alopoglossus lizard (Squamata, Alopoglossidae) from the Southern Guiana Shield, northeastern Amazonia, with remarks on diagnostic characters to the genus". Zootaxa 4422 (1): 025–040.
Ribeiro-Júnior MA, Amaral S (2017). "Catalogue of distribution of lizards (Reptilia: Squamata) from the Brazilian Amazonia. 4. Alopoglossidae, Gymnophthalmidae". Zootaxa 4269 (2): 151–196.
Vitt LJ, Ávila-Pires TCS, Espósito MC, Sartorius SS, Zani PA (2007). "Ecology of Alopoglossus angulatus and A. atriventris (Squamata, Gymnophthalmidae) in western Amazonia". Phyllomedusa 6 (1): 11–21.

Alopoglossus
Reptiles of Brazil
Reptiles of Colombia
Reptiles of Ecuador
Reptiles of Peru
Reptiles described in 1973
Taxa named by William Edward Duellman